Tony Benjamin (born October 27, 1955) is a former professional American football player who played in the National Football League (NFL) for seasons, from 1977 to 1979, with the Seattle Seahawks.

References

1955 births
Living people
American football fullbacks
Duke Blue Devils football players
Seattle Seahawks players
People from Monessen, Pennsylvania
Players of American football from Pennsylvania